Microcotyle branchiostegi is a species of monogenean, parasitic on the gills of a marine fish. It belongs to the family Microcotylidae.

Taxonomy
Microcotyle branchiostegi was first described by Yamaguti in 1937 from the gills of the horsehead tilefish Branchiostegus japonicus off Japan.  Unnithan (1971) placed this species in the new genus and subgenus Caenomicrocotyle as Caenomicrocotyle (Caenomicrocotyle) branchiostegi. However, this genus and this subgenus were returned into the genus Microcotyle by Mamaev.

Hosts and localities

The type-host is the horsehead tilefish Branchiostegus japonicus (Malacanthidae). The type-locality is off Japan.

References 

Microcotylidae
Animals described in 1937
Parasites of fish
Fauna of Japan